As an independent, democratic and secular country, Bangladesh requires all foreigners to obtain permission (a visa) to enter its territory. Visas are issued by Bangladesh diplomatic missions located throughout the world or, if applicable, on arrival in Bangladesh. Genuine tourists, investors in Bangladesh, and business travellers can get a Visa On Arrival in Bangladesh, if travelling with all of the following: 
 US $500 or €500 in cash/credit; 
 an eligible passport which is valid for at least 6 months after arrival in Bangladesh; 
 printout of a return/onward air ticket or international train ticket or international bus ticket; 
 printout of a booking, with a hotel or a tour company in Bangladesh, valid for the entire duration of the intended stay in Bangladesh; or an invitation letter from a business or a company operating in Bangladesh; or the contact details of Bangladeshi close relatives, residing in Bangladesh, who are expecting and will vouch for the visa seeker; 
 and entering Bangladesh by air, sea or road but not on a train. 
The Visa On Arrival fee must be paid only in cash in US dollars or Euros when entering Bangladesh and the cost per person is US$51 or €51, with all taxes included. The maximum duration of this single-entry Visa On Arrival is 30 days and it can be extended for an additional 30 days. Applicants can apply for the extension of the Visa On Arrival up to a week before visa expiry but not sooner. Visa extensions are available at the Department of Immigration and Passports located in Shere-E-Bangla Nagar, West Agargaon, Dhaka City. It is just adjacent to the main Dhaka Passport Office building in Agargaon. Most diplomats can get a Visa On Arrival in Bangladesh if travelling with a diplomatic passport. The issuance of a Visa On Arrival in Bangladesh is at the sole discretion of the immigration official at the port of entry in Bangladesh. Travellers who wish to enter Bangladesh for any purpose other than tourism, investment or business, and all foreigners who are not visa exempt, need a valid Bangladeshi visa beforehand to enter Bangladesh. Regular visas are available at all diplomatic missions of Bangladesh worldwide. A regular visa is usually a multiple-entry visa valid up to 60 months, unlike a Visa On Arrival, which is just a single-entry visa valid up to 30 days. All these visas can be extended or renewed at the Department of Immigration and Passports in Dhaka City.

Visa policy map

Visa exemption
Citizens of the following 23 countries are exempt from visa requirement for visits up to 90 days:

Visa on arrival

According to data provided by IATA, the following countries are specifically listed as countries whose citizens can obtain visa on arrival for the purpose of official duty, business, investment and tourism regardless of the Bangladeshi mission status:

On 31 March 2021, the Ministry of Foreign Affairs of Bangladesh posted on the official facebook page that on a basis of reciprocity, Bangladesh has offered “Free Visit Visa” facility to Indonesian nationals.

On 2 May 2021, the Indonesian Embassy in Dhaka confirmed the news on the official page of the Ministry of Foreign Affairs of Indonesia.

It is elaborated that Indonesian citizens are now able to visit Bangladesh with free-of-charge visa on arrival facility.

Other countries require a visa to enter Bangladesh but in fact, there is no exact data on this.

However, according to Henry & Partners and the Passport Index, citizens of the following countries are known to require a visa:

1 — unless they are residing in a country without a Bangladeshi representation

Admission refused
	
Entry and transit is refused to Israeli passports holders.

No Visa Required seal/vignette 
Bangladesh missions provide a No Visa Required (NVR) seal or vignette (sticker) for citizens of Bangladesh who have a foreign passport and dual nationality, as well as to non-Bangladeshis who are the legally married spouses or children of citizens of Bangladesh. The NVR is placed on a blank page in the applicant's foreign passport. It is either in the form of a seal or a vignette (sticker), although the seal version is being phased out and replaced by the vignette. This NVR allows the passport holder to travel to Bangladesh an unlimited number of times without any restrictions on duration, or limits on entry, throughout the validity of the passport containing the NVR. The guidelines of the Ministry of Home Affairs do not explicitly indicate whether the spousal NVR entitlement only applies to opposite-sex couples. The NVR is valid until the expiry of the non-Bangladeshi passport the NVR is in. Once this passport expires, a new NVR can be placed in a new passport of the same person by showing the previous expired passport containing the expired NVR.

Non-ordinary passports
Additionally, only holders of diplomatic and official passports of the following countries do not require visas for 30 days unless otherwise noted:

 and  signed an agreement of abolishing visas for diplomatic and service passports on 25th of may 2022.

2020 pandemic travel restrictions
During the COVID-19 pandemic, visa on arrival was no longer available for persons who had previously visited China, Iran, Italy or South Korea. The same policy was imposed on all nationals of China.

See also

Visa requirements for Bangladeshi citizens
Diplomatic Missions of Bangladesh
Foreign relations of Bangladesh
Foreign policy of Bangladesh
Bangladesh Visa Portal

References

Bangladesh
Foreign relations of Bangladesh